KUNW-CD (channel 2) is a low-power, Class A television station in Yakima, Washington, United States, affiliated with the Spanish-language Univision network. It is owned by Sinclair Broadcast Group alongside CBS/CW+ affiliate KIMA-TV (channel 29). Both stations share studios on Terrace Heights Boulevard in Yakima, while KUNW-CD's transmitter is located on Ahtanum Ridge.

On April 11, 2013, Fisher Communications announced that it would sell its properties, including KUNW and KIMA, to the Sinclair Broadcast Group. The deal was completed on August 8, 2013.

Technical information

Subchannels
The station's digital signal is multiplexed:

Translators
KUNW's programming is also seen on two additional stations, both serving the Tri-Cities area of Richland, Pasco, and Kennewick:

An additional station, KWWA-CA (channel 49, originally K49EI from 1996 to 2001 and KWWA-LP from 2001 to 2003), previously served Ellensburg. However, the station signed off April 17, 2008 after suffering antenna failure. Fisher opted to return the license to the FCC instead of repairing the antenna, and KWWA's license was canceled on June 4, 2008.

References

External links

Univision network affiliates
Comet (TV network) affiliates
TBD (TV network) affiliates
Charge! (TV network) affiliates
UNW-CD
Television channels and stations established in 1996
1996 establishments in Washington (state)
UNW-CD
Sinclair Broadcast Group
Low-power television stations in the United States